Cherenkov (sometimes spelled Čerenkov or Cerenkov) is a common Russian surname, which may refer to:

Andrei Cherenkov (born 1976), Russian professional football manager and former player
Andrew Cherenkov, a fictional character in the video game Xenosaga Episode I
Fyodor Cherenkov (1959-2014), Soviet and Russian footballer
Pavel Alekseyevich Cherenkov (1904–1990), Soviet physicist and a recipient of the Nobel Prize in physics in 1958

See also
Cherenkov Array at Themis, an atmospheric Cherenkov imaging telescope
Cherenkov detector, a particle detector
Ring-imaging Cherenkov detector
Cherenkov luminescence imaging
Cherenkov radiation, particular occurrence of electromagnetic radiation
Cherenkov Telescope Array, a multinational worldwide project
High Altitude Water Cherenkov Experiment
Imaging Atmospheric Cherenkov Technique
Radio Ice Cherenkov Experiment
Track Imaging Cherenkov Experiment

Russian-language surnames